Eric P. Caspar (born Jürg Kretz; 14 May 1941) is a Swiss actor. He appeared in more than fifty films since 1970.

Selected filmography

References

External links 

1941 births
Living people
Swiss male film actors